2002–03 Hong Kong FA Cup was the 29th staging of the Hong Kong FA Cup.

The competition started on 6 April 2003 with 8 Hong Kong First Division clubs. The cup competition was a single-elimination tournament. All matches were held at the Mongkok Stadium

Teams
 Buler Rangers
 Double Flower
 Fukien
 Happy Valley
 HKFC
 South China
 Sun Hei
 Xiangxue Pharmaceutical

Fixtures and results
All times are Hong Kong Time (UTC+8).

Bracket

Quarter-finals

Semi-finals

Final

Goalscorers

Prizes
 Champion (HK$50,000): Sun Hei
 1st Runners-up (HK$10,000): Buler Rangers

References

External links
 HKFA Website, 近五屆足總盃回顧(一) 

Hong Kong FA Cup
Hong Kong Fa Cup
Fa Cup